João Maurício Vanderlei or Wanderley, first and only baron of Cotegipe (October 23, 1815 – February 13, 1889), was a Brazilian magistrate and politician of the Conservative Party.

Born as the son of João Maurício Vanderlei, a Dutch descendant, and Francisca Antónia do Livramento, of Portuguese ancestry.

He graduated from the University of Olinda in 1837 with a bachelor's degree in Law and was Marine Minister, Farm Minister, External Minister and Justice Minister of Brazil. He was also President of the Senate of Brazil from 1881 to 1885, and President of the Council of Ministers from 1885 until 1888 and president of the Banco do Brasil.

He was dismissed from his post by Princess Isabel during her third regency in 1888. Months later, as a senator, he was the only one to vote against the approval of the Golden Law, which abolished slavery. He is assigned the dialogue with the Princess where he says: "Your Highness released a race but lost the throne" to which the Princess promptly replied: "A thousand thrones I had, a thousand thrones I would give to liberate the slaves of Brazil"

References

External links
 Biography 
 Worldstatesmen – Brazil

1815 births
1889 deaths
Finance Ministers of Brazil
Prime Ministers of Brazil
Presidents of the Senate of the Empire of Brazil
Brazilian people of Dutch descent
Conservative Party (Brazil) politicians
Brazilian monarchists
Brazilian nobility
Members of the Senate of the Empire of Brazil
Ministers of Justice of Brazil